Nepalese English refers to a variety of the English language principally used in Nepal and is heavily influenced by the Indo-Aryan languages of Nepal. 

Many Nepalese speak English as a second or foreign language, with English use being most prevalent among city dwellers residing in Kathmandu (the capital of Nepal). Although Nepali is the native language, English is the primary language used for business in Nepal.  In Nepal, where modern English education began in the 1850s, there is little or no consensus among teachers and practitioners on whether to follow British, American or Indian variants of English, or allow the development of a Nepal-specific variety of English.

Colloquially Nepalese English is known as Nenglish (a term first recorded in 1999), or, less commonly, as Nepanglish (2000) or Neplish (2002).

See also
Languages of Nepal
Nepali Language
Nepal
Gurung Language
Magar Language
Tamang Language
Limbu Language
Newar Language

References

Languages attested from the 1850s
Dialects of English
English